Baywatch the Movie: Forbidden Paradise is a 1995 American direct-to-video action  comedy film which was about the characters of the popular series Baywatch vacationing in Hawaii. In the film, The Baywatch lifeguards moves to Hawaii for a tropical adventure. The team is threatened when Matt is stung by a fish and captured by Hawaiian villagers.

It was later released as a two-part episode of the series during the sixth season. It was also released as a theatrical film in Europe and other parts of the world.

The film is followed by a sequel, Baywatch: White Thunder at Glacier Bay (1998).

Plot
Baywatch lifeguards Mitch, Stephanie, C.J., Matt, Caroline and Logan travel to Oahu, Hawaii for a vacation and get caught up in a series of misadventures.

Stephanie teamed up with a local lifeguard. Logan became obsessed with competing in a surfing competition which left no time for his girlfriend and fellow lifeguard Caroline.

C.J. was called back to Baywatch, while Mitch and Matt took a boat trip to a remote part of Kauai where they were stranded after Matt was stung by a poisonous scorpion fish, and then they were captured in a remote village of local Hawaiians who had gone native.

It also serves as David Charvet's last Baywatch appearance, spelling an end to his popular character Matt Brody.

Cast
 David Hasselhoff as Mitch Buchannon
 Pamela Anderson as C.J. Parker
 Yasmine Bleeth as Caroline Holden
 Alexandra Paul as Lt. Stephanie Holden
 David Charvet as Matt Brody
 Ricky Dean Logan as Carlton Edwards
 Heidi Mark as Holly
 Gerry Lopez as Himself
 Vincent Klyn as Mark Kealoha
 Jaason Simmons as Logan Fowler
 Lee Doversola as Lea
 Sidney S. Liufau as Mako (Sidney Lauf)
 Brian L. Keaulana as Brian Keaulana
 Ron Rice as Ron
 Buffalo Keaulana as Buffalo
 Celeste Akeo as Mai
 Wallace Akeo as Kona
 Keokeokalae Hughes as Mrs. Alede
 Kimo Hugho as Mr. Alede
 Laisene Auelua as Manu
 Frank Moran as Frank

References

Forbidden Paradise
American drama television films
1995 direct-to-video films
1995 films
1995 drama films
Films set in Hawaii
Films about lifesaving
1990s English-language films
1990s American films